Zanhuang is a town in and the seat of Zanhuang County, in southwestern Hebei province, China, located in the foothills of the Taihang Mountains about  south-southwest of the provincial capital of Shijiazhuang. , it has 25 villages under its administration.

See also
List of township-level divisions of Hebei

References

Township-level divisions of Hebei